The impact of the petroleum industry has been increasing globally as China ranks seventh for oil production and second in crude oil consumption in the world.

China imported a record 6.7m barrels a day (b/d) of oil in 2015 and was forecast "to overtake the U.S. as the world’s biggest crude importer in 2016"

History

Early history
Before the development of the industry, Chinese oil production was measured in quarts and output used solely as a lubricant. The first well, developed under the most primitive of conditions and with relatively untrained personnel, began to produce over twenty barrels of oil a day.

In time, with equipment brought in from Sichuan and elsewhere and the development of several distillation plants, nine more wells were drilled in the immediate area of Yumen wells which then had a capacity of about 1,000 barrels of oil and 10,000 gallons of gasoline a day, except in winter when cold weather caused the oil to congeal. This was the first major oil field in China.

Ensuring adequate energy supply to sustain economic growth has been a core concern of the Chinese government since 1949.

In 1956 a rail link was built to Lanzhou; until then, the oil was transported out by truck. A pipeline was constructed in 1957. The Yumen refinery was enlarged and modernized, and by the late 1960s it was reported that production from that area was "about two million tons".

The development and construction of Karamay oilfield strongly supported the economic construction of the People's Republic of China in the early days after the founding of the People's Republic of China. In 1958, Qinghai Petroleum Exploration Bureau, based on the discovery of Lenghu structural belt by the Geological Department, drilled a high-yield oil well with a daily output of 800 tons in Lenghu No. 5 structure, and successively proved Lenghu No. 5, No. 4 and No. 3 oil fields. In Sichuan, a natural gas zone was discovered from Chongqing in the east to Zigong in the west and Xushui in the south. In 1958, the Ministry of Petroleum organized a battle in central Sichuan and discovered seven oil fields, including Nanchong and Guihua.

In 1959, large reserves were discovered in Songhua Jiang-Liao basin in northeast China and later several other giant oilfields were found. The most important is the Daqing oil field in Heilongjiang that has been the backbone of Chinese oil production for many decades.

Export era
In 1973, as production increased, China began exporting crude oil to Japan, and began offshore exploration. Exports increased to 20 million tons in 1985, before internal consumption began increasing faster than production.  By 1993, internal demand for oil exceeded domestic production, and China became a net oil importer.

Import dependence
Although China is still a major crude oil producer, it became an oil importer in the 1990s. China became dependent on imported oil for the first time in its history in 1993 due to demand rising faster than domestic production. In 2002, annual crude petroleum production was 1,298,000,000 barrels, and annual crude petroleum consumption was 1,670,000,000 barrels.

In 2006, it imported 145 million tons of crude oil, accounting for 47% of its total oil consumption.

By 2008, much of China's oil imports derived largely from Southeast Asia, but its growing demand forced it to import oil from all over the globe.

In 2013 the pace of China's economic growth exceeded the domestic oil capacity and floods damaged the nation's oil fields in the middle of the year. Consequently, China imported oil to compensate for the supply reduction and surpassed the US in September 2013 to become the world's largest importer of oil.

Oil prices rose in early trade on February 6, 2023, after declining 8% in the week prior to January 31st, 2023. Brent crude futures rose 0.2% to $80.10 a barrel and WTI crude futures increased 0.2% to $73.54 a barrel. The IEA predicts China will drive half of global oil demand growth this year and may prompt OPEC+ to reassess its output cuts. Russian product price caps took effect on February 5, 2023, but are expected to have minimal impact on overall supplies.

Domestic production

A big role is played in China's oil endowment by its state owned oil companies, mainly China National Offshore Oil Corporation, China National Petroleum Corporation, China National Refinery Corp, and Sinopec.

Province started producing in 1960, and by 1963 was producing nearly 2.3 million tons of oil. Production from Daqing declined, but in 1965, oil fields in Shengli, Shandong, Dagang, and Tianjin yielded enough oil to nearly eliminate the need of importing crude oil. In 2002, annual crude petroleum production was 1,298,000,000 barrels, and annual crude petroleum consumption was 1,670,000,000 barrels.

In 2005 China began to take drastic measures with its internal oil reserve programs as domestic oil production in China supplied only two-thirds of its needs and the estimated consumption requirement by 2020 was about 600 million tons of crude oil.

Oil drilling platforms

The largest oil field in the South China Sea, the Liuhua 11-1 field – located 210 km southeast of Hong Kong in the Pearl River Mouth Basin offshore south China, was discovered by Amoco (now BP) in January 1987 in typhoon alley. Water depth, the presence of heavy oil and a "very strong bottom-water drive" were among the technical challenges that had to be resolved before the oil could be extracted. Amoco and Nanhai East engineering teams experimented with offshore drilling techniques, floating production, storage and off-loading system (FPSO) that would have drilling and production support.  By 2008, the FPSO had equipment capable of handling 65,000 bbl of oil and 300,000 bbl of total fluids per day and it would be loaded and shipped by shuttle tankers.

In 2010, oil blocks in Wushi oil field (off Zhanjiang, near Hainan) began to be auctioned to foreign companies, with CNOOC having the option to increase its stake to 51% whenever required.

China's $1 billion oil drilling rig, the Haiyang Shiyou 981 – owned and operated by the China National Offshore Oil Corporation – in the South China Sea, Ocean Oil 981 – began its first drilling operations in 2012. It led to protests and hence had to be shifted back.

Foreign production
This shift to dependence on foreign oil has changed the exploration and acquisition policies of China. China's oil need overwhelmed its internal capabilities.

China National Offshore Oil Corp, China National Petroleum Corp, and Sinopec have largely invested in exploration and development in countries that had oil fields but do not have funds or technology to develop them.  In 2004 CNOOC signed a deal to extract a million barrels of oil a day in Indonesia as well as other projects with Australia.  In addition, an oil reserve that would theoretically fill with 30 days worth of oil has begun construction in China.  However, their oil policy on the world oil market was not completely clear as to how they would deal with the situation as a whole.

The Chinese government is taking diplomatic action to improve their relationship with ASEAN states. According to a 2008 report, the Chinese government had to take extra strides to secure good relationships with its neighbors. Malaysia is a neighbor state that was often seen as in contention with China because of political differences. Yet, the relationship with Malaysia was symbiotic because of their large supply of oil and their need for security assurances from China. In 2008 Malaysia was the number one producer of petroleum in the South China Sea, and they account for over one half of the production in the region.

Foreign acquisitions
By 2008, China owned less than 1 percent of the oil company BP, worth about $1.97 billion.

Trade encouragement 
The National Assembly of Pakistan has passed the Trade Dispute Resolution Bill, 2022 to help enhance the trust of foreign buyers in the country and provide a mechanism for exporters to file claims and complaints against their foreign clients. The bill aims to improve contract enforcement and Pakistan's ranking on the World Bank's Ease of Doing Business Index by establishing a comprehensive system for resolving disputes related to exports and imports, including e-commerce.

Energy security

Strategic Petroleum Reserve

China has one of the world's largest strategic oil reserves. Global strategic petroleum reserves (GSPR) refer to stockpiles of crude oil held by countries (and private industry) for national security during an energy crisis.

By 2004 China was investing in its first national oil reserve base to avoid foreign dependence. There are three different provinces in which they are focusing. The first Zhoushan, Zhejiang Province, was built by Sinopec, China's largest oil refining company. The storage space is 5.2 million cubic meters says the National Development and Reform Commission.  Zhejiang was originally a commercial oil transfer base. Its coastal position makes it convenient for movement purposes, although it is at the same time vulnerable to offshore violence. The next reserve of interest In Huangdao or Qingdao, Shandong Province and the final Dalian, Liaoning Province. All of these reserves are coastal and with their creation comes vulnerability to possible coastal attacks. In 2007, United Press International journalist questioned energy security, as all three of the stock oil bases were within range of Taiwanese cruise missile attacks. These stockpiling strategies, as well as the international acquisition companies, are state-run initiatives to combat supply disruption.

According to a 2007 article in China News, at that time China's expanded reserve would include both mandated commercial reserves and a state-controlled reserves and would be implemented in three stages to be completed by 2011. The state-controlled reserves phase one consisted of a  reserve to be completed by the end of 2008. The second phase of the government-controlled reserves with an additional  was to be completed by 2011.

Along with an emphasis on defensive oil stocks, there is a significant push to create an offensive oil acquisition program. In March 2018, as part of a bid to establish its position as an economic superpower, China introduced a new oil benchmark.

Transportation
In 2004, China had to import 100 million tons of crude oil to supply its energy demand, more than half of which came from the Middle East. China is attempting to secure its future oil share and establish deals with other countries.  Communist Party general secretary Hu Jintao has proposed to build a pipeline from Russian oil fields to support China's markets as well as other billion-dollar arrangements with Russia, Central Asia, and Burma, and diversify its energy sector by seeking imports from other regions of the world and by starting alternative energy programs such as nuclear.

In 2009 China completed its first critical oil pipeline, the Atyrau-Alashankou oil pipeline (Kazakhstan–China oil pipeline) in Central Asia, as part of a larger overall trade expansion with the Central Asian region which represented a trade volume of over $US $50 billion by 2013, up from $1 billion in 2000.

See also

 Climate change in China
 Natural gas in China

References

Sources 
 Weller, J. Marvin. Caravan Across China: An American Geologist Explores the Northwest 1937–1938. (1984). March Hare Publishing, San Francisco. .

External links 
China Petroleum and Chemical Industry Association (CPCIA) 

Petroleum in China
China